Glass, Lewis & Co. (Glass Lewis) is a major American proxy advisory services company. As of spring 2019, Glass Lewis controlled 28% of the proxy advisory market for mutual funds; this makes it the second-largest company in the market behind Institutional Shareholder Services. The primary service Glass Lewis provides is research and recommendations for shareholder votes by institutional investors, including a digital platform for managing these votes and reporting. A large fraction of those investors follow the recommendations of Glass Lewis in lockstep, giving it outsize importance and impact on governance across the corporate sphere.

Founded in 2003, Glass Lewis is headquartered in San Francisco and has offices in New York, Washington DC, Kansas City, Ireland, Germany, and Australia.

In September 2006, Glass Lewis acquired Sydney-based proxy advisory firm Corporate Governance International which then became known as CGI Glass Lewis. In November 2008, Glass Lewis acquired Washington Analysis, a political and economic advisory firm based in Washington, D.C. Founded in 1973 and rated among the Best Analysts of the Year  by Institutional Investor magazine, Washington Analysis anticipates and analyzes the impact of political, legislative and regulatory developments on the financial markets.

In June 2015, Glass Lewis acquired IVOX GmbH, Germany's leading independent provider of proxy advisory and governance services for institutional investors.

Until March 2021, Glass Lewis was owned by the Ontario Teachers' Pension Plan, and the Alberta Investment Management Corp. In March 2021, Peloton Capital Management, a private equity firm, and Stephen Smith, a financial services entrepreneur, acquired Glass Lewis from Ontario Teachers' Pension Plan and the Alberta Investment Management Corp.

Knight Therapeutics Board Slate Controversy 

In April–May 2019, Glass, Lewis & Co controversially did not recuse itself from issuing voting recommendations in a proxy contest at Knight Therapeutics, a Canadian company. In advance of the May 7th, 2019 vote, Glass, Lewis & Co sided with the slate of nominees which included Kevin Cameron, a co-founder and past senior executive at Glass, Lewis & Co itself. This precedent could encourage future activist shareholders to include past proxy advisor senior executives in their nominee slates to unfairly obtain favorable recommendations. Additionally, Cameron did not disclose in any of his publicly released biographies at the time the fact that he was on the board of directors of two separate public companies as they filed for bankruptcy (ECOTality - ticker:ECTY and Reddy Ice - ticker:FRZ). This raised concerns about neutrality and disclosure which are particularly significant given the company's outsize impact on the broader corporate sphere and access to extensive sensitive information where neutrality is difficult to confirm and tempting to discard.

Notable Policies
Glass Lewis has stated that it will use its shareholder proxy to vote against boards of directors that are not adequately diverse.

References

External links 
 Glass, Lewis & Co.

Business organizations based in the United States
Financial services companies established in 2003
Proxy firms